The Evanston Formation is a geological formation in Wyoming whose strata date back to the Late Cretaceous. Dinosaur remains are among the fossils that have been recovered from the formation. The fossil formation also has the remains of prehistoric mammals from the Paleocene epoch.

Vertebrate paleofauna
 Alamosaurus sp.
 Triceratops horridus
Insectivora
Multituberculata
Primates
Condylarthra
Creodonta

See also

 List of dinosaur-bearing rock formations

References

Paleogene geology of Wyoming
Maastrichtian Stage of North America